Victoriano "Nano" Rivas Álvaro (born 7 July 1980), sometimes known as just Nano , is a Spanish retired footballer who mainly played as a central defender, and a manager.

He appeared in 138 La Liga matches during seven seasons while scoring ten goals, mainly in representation of Betis (three years) and Levante (two). He also represented in the competition Getafe and Valladolid.

Playing career
Born in Ciudad Real, Castile-La Mancha, Nano made his professional debut with Atlético Madrid's B-team, playing two full seasons with the third division side. In 2002–03 he was loaned to Getafe CF in the second level, before moving to the club on a permanent deal in the summer of 2003; an undisputed starter with the Madrid outskirts team, he scored four goals in 37 games in the 2004–05 campaign, their first ever in La Liga.

Nano was signed by Real Betis in 2005. He was set to have a promising season before being injured in the UEFA Champions League group stage match against Chelsea at the Manuel Ruiz de Lopera on 1 November, in his first and only appearance in the competition, as he was ruled out of action for five months; he also featured once in the UEFA Cup and made 14 league appearances in his first year, and played a further 21 matches for a side that finished 16th in 2006–07.

Established as first-choice stopper alongside veteran Juanito in the 2007–08 campaign, Nano scored in the first matchday against Recreativo de Huelva (1–1 away draw), but suffered a severe knee injury against Deportivo de La Coruña on 16 September 2007, which made him miss six months of action. Upon return from injury, he netted another important goal for the Andalusians, in a 1–1 tie at former club Getafe on 18 May 2008.

On 1 September 2008, a one-year loan deal was agreed as Nano joined Real Valladolid in a season-long move. He appeared scarcely throughout his spell, as both stopper and left back, and his return to Betis would be even more unassuming as it consisted of one league match (18 minutes), with the team failing to return to the top division.

In August 2010, aged 30, Nano signed with Levante UD. An automatic first-choice during his first season, he scored in a 2–0 home win against Atlético Madrid on 4 December.

Nano started in all the games for the Valencian Community side during the first half of 2011–12, as they spent the vast majority of that period in UEFA Champions League qualification positions. In very late January 2012, however, he was sold to Guizhou Renhe F.C. of the Chinese Super League.

Nano announced his retirement in February 2014. On 6 July of the following year, he was appointed Vicente Moreno's assistant manager at Gimnàstic de Tarragona.

Coaching career
On 25 May 2016, Nano was named Getafe CF B manager. He returned to Gimnàstic roughly one year later, being appointed at the helm of the main squad for the remainder of the season.

After managing to narrowly avoid relegation, Nano left Nàstic in June 2017. The following 29 January, however, he replaced fired Rodri at the helm of the same club, but was himself dismissed on 13 May.

In November 2018, Nano was hired by K.S.V. Roeselare of the Belgian First Division B, replacing compatriot Jordi Condom. Only two months later he left to assist Quique Sánchez Flores at Shanghai Greenland Shenhua F.C. and was replaced by a third Spaniard, Juanito.

Managerial statistics

Honours

Player
Guizhou Renhe
Chinese FA Cup: 2013

References

External links

1980 births
Living people
People from Ciudad Real
Sportspeople from the Province of Ciudad Real
Spanish footballers
Footballers from Castilla–La Mancha
Association football defenders
La Liga players
Segunda División players
Segunda División B players
Atlético Madrid C players
Atlético Madrid B players
Getafe CF footballers
Real Betis players
Real Valladolid players
Levante UD footballers
Chinese Super League players
Beijing Renhe F.C. players
Spanish expatriate footballers
Expatriate footballers in China
Spanish expatriate sportspeople in China
Spanish football managers
Segunda División managers
Gimnàstic de Tarragona managers
K.S.V. Roeselare managers
Spanish expatriate football managers
Expatriate football managers in Belgium
Spanish expatriate sportspeople in Belgium
Shanghai Shenhua F.C. non-playing staff